John Joseph McMahon (September 27, 1875 – December 31, 1932) was an American prelate of the Roman Catholic Church. He served as bishop of the Diocese of Trenton in New Jersey from 1928 until his death in 1932.

Biography

Early life 
John McMahon was born on September 27, 1875, in Hinsdale, New York. He graduated from Union High School in 1893. McMahon then attended St. Bonaventure University in Allegany, New York, earning a Bachelor of Arts degree.  He completed his theological studies at the Pontifical Urbaniana University in Rome.

McMahon was ordained to the priesthood for the Diocese of Buffalo on May 20, 1900. On returning to New York, he served as a curate in parishes in Jamestown and Buffalo before becoming pastor of a parish in Newfane. He also served as assistant superintendent of diocesan schools and director of the Holy Name Society.

Bishop of Trenton 
On March 2, 1928, McMahon was appointed the fourth bishop of  the Diocese of Trenton by Pope Pius XI. He received his episcopal consecration on April 26, 1928, from Bishop William Turner, with Bishops Thomas Walsh and Edmund Gibbons serving as co-consecrators, at St. Joseph's Cathedral. He was installed at St. Mary's Cathedral, Trenton, New Jersey on May 10, 1928. 

After four years as bishop, John McMahon died in Buffalo at age 57 on December 31, 1932.

References

1875 births
1932 deaths
People from Cattaraugus County, New York
20th-century Roman Catholic bishops in the United States
St. Bonaventure University alumni
Roman Catholic bishops of Trenton
Catholics from New York (state)